Leptospermum petersonii, commonly known as lemon-scented teatree, is a species of shrub or small tree that is endemic to eastern Australia. It has thin, fibrous or flaky bark, often strongly-scented elliptic to lance-shaped leaves, white flowers and fruit that are retained for several years. It is commonly grown as an ornamental and is regarded as a minor environmental weed in some areas.

Description
It has thin, rough, fibrous or flaky bark on the stems, and glabrous branchlets that have a flange under the leaf bases. New growth is often tinged with red or purple. The flower buds have thin, papery, reddish brown bracts and bracteoles at the base but that usually fall as the bud develops. The capsules remain on the younger stems but are lost as the plant ages.

Taxonomy and naming
Leptospermum petersonii was first formally described in 1905 by Frederick Manson Bailey in the Queensland Agricultural Journal from a specimen collected by W.J. Peterson on Wilsons Peak in January 1905.

Distribution and habitat
Lemon-scented teatree grows in sclerophyll forest or rainforest near creeks or on rocky escarpments south from Mount Timbeerwah in south-east Queensland to near Port Macquarie in New South Wales.

Ecology
This teatree is commonly grown in gardens from where it sometimes spreads. It has become established in some places beyond its natural range, including in native vegetation near Sydney and Melbourne and in Hawaii.

Uses

Essential oils
The essential oil from L. petersonii inhibits the pathological fungi Candida albicans and Aspergillus fumigatus.

Use in horticulture
Lemon-scented teatree is well known as a garden plant, popular for its scent and attractiveness. It is fast growing and can be kept to shrub height by pruning. The ability to be pruned regularly also makes it well-suited for hedges, windbreaks and harvesting for distilled essential oils.

References

 Harden, G.J., Flora of New South Wales, Volume 2, .

peteronii
Myrtales of Australia
Flora of New South Wales
Flora of Queensland
Plants described in 1905
Taxa named by Frederick Manson Bailey